The 1995 Cork Intermediate Hurling Championship was the 86th staging of the Cork Intermediate Hurling Championship since its establishment by the Cork County Board in 1909. The draw for the opening fixtures took place on 11 December 1994. The championship began on 3 June 1995 and ended on 8 October 1995.

On 8 October 1995, Kilbrittain won the championship following a 2-17 to 1-05 defeat of Ballincollig in the final at Páirc Uí Chaoimh. This was their first ever championship title.

Kilbrittain's Dan O'Connell was the championship's top scorer with 4-20.

Team changes

From Championship

Promoted to the Cork Senior Hurling Championship
 St. Catherine's

To Championship

Promoted from the Cork Junior A Hurling Championship
 Carrigtwohill

Results

First round

Second round

Quarter-finals

Semi-finals

Final

Championship statistics

Top scorers

Overall

In a single game

References

Cork Intermediate Hurling Championship
Cork Intermediate Hurling Championship